"Somebody Somewhere" is the debut single by Canadian country rock artist Dallas Smith. It was released in November 2011 as the first single from his debut solo album, Jumped Right In. It peaked at number 79 on the Canadian Hot 100 in February 2012.

"Somebody Somewhere" was nominated for Single of the Year at the 2012 Canadian Country Music Association Awards.

Critical reception
Jeff DeDekker of the Leader-Post wrote that "the tune somehow manages to remain upbeat while Smith sings of what should have been."

Music video
The music video was directed by Stephano Barberis and premiered in December 2011. It won the 2012 British Columbia Country Music Association award for Video of the Year.

Chart performance
"Somebody Somewhere" debuted at number 84 on the Canadian Hot 100 for the week of February 4, 2012.

Certifications

References

2011 songs
2011 debut singles
Dallas Smith songs
604 Records singles
Songs written by Rodney Clawson
Songs written by Dustin Lynch
Music videos directed by Stephano Barberis
Song recordings produced by Joey Moi
Songs written by Lynn Hutton